Killing Field is a 2018 Burmese action-thriller film, directed by Thar Nyi starring Min Thway, Si Phyo, Nay Ye and Htoo Char. The film, produced by Myaing Tha Ra Phu Film Production premiered in Myanmar on December 14, 2018.

Cast

Main cast
Min Thway as Sam
Si Phyo as Si Thu
Nay Ye as Paing Soe
Htoo Char as Na Gar

Guest cast
Paing Phyo Thu as Kham
Nay Toe
Thet Mon Myint
Zin Wine

References

2018 films
2010s Burmese-language films
2018 action thriller films
Films shot in Myanmar
Burmese action thriller films